Važecká Cave (and ) is a  long stalactite limestone cave. The cave was discovered in 1922. Of the 530 m total length,  are open to the public.

Although it is one of the shorter caves, it is known for its rich stalactite decoration, as well as for its cave fauna.

External links
 Važecká Cave at Slovak Caves Administration

Show caves in Slovakia
Geography of Žilina Region
Tourist attractions in Žilina Region